Wuxi is a prefecture-level city in Jiangsu.

Wuxi may also refer to:

 Wuxi County, a county in Chongqing Municipality
 Wuxi, Luxi (武溪镇), a town of Luxi County, Hunan
 Wu Xi (footballer), Chinese footballer who currently plays in the Chinese Super League
 Wu Xi (Chinese diplomat), ambassador of China to New Zealand